Adi Bakel , also spelled Adiba'ikel or Ādība’ikel)  is a village in the Debub region and Hadegti sub-region in Eritrea.

The Hadegti Subregion includes the villages Adi Bakel, Iwanet, Adebuur, Adi Keyih, Hadish Adi, Maereba and Degra Merieto.

The inhabitants of Hadegti speak Tigrinya. In Adi Bakel, there are two Orthodox Tewahedo Churches.

"Adi" means "village" or "hometown" and "Bakel" means a red clay.

Location 
The village lies at an elevation of 2092 metres above sea level. It is located about 18 km southwest of Dekemhare, 11 km northwest of Segheneyti and 55 km south of the capital Asmara, which is partly on a gentle slope and the other part on a level. Adi Bakel lies between Dekemhare and Segheneyti.

History 
The inhabitants of the four villages Maereba, Adi Bakel, Adi Keyih and Adi Abuur are the sons and daughters of Hadgay, so the progenitor is called Hadgay. More precisely, Hubo, the son of Hadgay had 5 boys named Tearezghi, Tesfazghi, Meharezghi, Tsegazghi and Ngadazghi. Tearezghi is the progenitor of Adi Bakel's Resident.
The inhabitants of Adi Bakel originally come from the village of Mareeba. Adi Bakel is divided into four districts or tribes, the four tribes are called Inda Gebrekrstos, Inda Bahamenet (Inda Okbakristos and Inda Andu belong to Inda Bahamenet), Inda Halies (there are not many, Inda Demshash belong to Inda Halies) and Inda Kelit (the first Residents of Adi Bakel, who emigrated from Maereba and discovered Adi Bakel).

Popular places 
Inda dio is a popular place in Adi Bakel, which is west of St. Mary's Church. The residents of Adi Bakel describe Inda dio as a special and most beautiful place in the world. For the residents of Adi Bakel, Indadio is and was a place of love, laughter, games (especially football games), and peace. Inda dio has the qualities of a good mother, exudes contentment and makes everyone happy.
The residents of Adi Bakel, mainly children and young people, play soccer almost all day until sunset and when the soccer game is over everyone runs to the entertainment room to get a seat, where they chat and laugh about the winners and losers of soccer.

Economy 
The inhabitants live mainly from agriculture.

See also
 Human Rights Concern Eritrea

References

217.^ Christine,Owen."Navigating difference between         Tigrigna and          Tigrinya".  December 16, 2010

Further reading

 Beretekeab, R. (2000); Eritrea: The Making of a Nation 1890–1991. Thesis. Uppsala University, Uppsala. . .
 Cliffe, Lionel; Connell, Dan; Davidson, Basil (2005), Taking on the Superpowers: Collected Articles on the Eritrean Revolution (1976–1982). Red Sea Press, 
 Cliffe, Lionel & Davidson, Basil (1988), The Long Struggle of Eritrea for Independence and Constructive Peace. Spokesman Press, 
 Connell, Dan (1997), Against All Odds: A Chronicle of the Eritrean Revolution With a New Afterword on the Postwar Transition. Red Sea Press, 
 Connell, Dan (2001), Rethinking Revolution: New Strategies for Democracy & Social Justice: The Experiences of Eritrea, South Africa, Palestine & Nicaragua. Red Sea Press, 
 Connell, Dan (2004), Conversations with Eritrean Political Prisoners. Red Sea Press, 
 Connell, Dan (2005), Building a New Nation: Collected Articles on the Eritrean Revolution (1983–2002). Red Sea Press, 
 Firebrace, James & Holand, Stuart (1985), Never Kneel Down: Drought, Development and Liberation in Eritrea. Red Sea Press, 
 Gebre-Medhin, Jordan (1989), Peasants and Nationalism in Eritrea. Red Sea Press, 
 Hatem Elliesie: Decentralisation of Higher Education in Eritrea, Afrika Spectrum, Vol. 43 (2008) No. 1, p. 115–120.
 Hill, Justin (2002), Ciao Asmara, A classic account of contemporary Africa. Little, Brown, 
 Iyob, Ruth (1997), The Eritrean Struggle for Independence: Domination, Resistance, Nationalism, 1941–1993. Cambridge University Press, 
 Jacquin-Berdal, Dominique; Plaut, Martin (2004), Unfinished Business: Ethiopia and Eritrea at War. Red Sea Press, 
 Johns, Michael (1992), "Does Democracy Have a Chance", Congressional Record, 6 May 1992 
 Keneally, Thomas (1990), To Asmara 
 Kendie, Daniel (2005), The Five Dimensions of the Eritrean Conflict 1941–2004: Deciphering the Geo-Political Puzzle. Signature Book Printing, 
 Killion, Tom (1998), Historical Dictionary of Eritrea. Scarecrow Press, 
 Mauri, Arnaldo (2004), "Eritrea's Early Stages in Monetary and Banking Development", International Review of Economics, Vol. LI, n. 4.
 Mauri, Arnaldo (1998), "The First Monetary and Banking Experiences in Eritrea", African Review of Money, Finance and Banking, n. 1–2.
 Miran, Jonathan (2009), Red Sea Citizens: Cosmopolitan Society and Cultural Change in Massawa. Indiana University Press, 
 Müller, Tanja R.: Bare life and the developmental State: the Militarization of Higher Education in Eritrea, Journal of Modern African Studies, Vol. 46 (2008), No. 1, p. 1–21.
 Negash T. (1987); Italian Colonisation in Eritrea: Policies, Praxis and Impact, Uppsala Univwersity, Uppsala.
 
 Pateman, Roy (1998), Eritrea: Even the Stones Are Burning. Red Sea Press, 
 Phillipson, David W. (1998), Ancient Ethiopia.
 Reid, Richard. (2011). Frontiers of Violence in North-East Africa: Genealogies of Conflict Since c. 1800. Oxford: Oxford University Press. 
 Wrong, Michela (2005), I Didn't Do It For You: How the World Betrayed a Small African Nation. Harper Collins,

External links

Others
 Report of the Commission of Inquiry on Human Rights in Eritrea, United Nations Human Rights Council Report, 8 June 2015
 Documentary on Women's liberation in Eritrea
 Tigrinya online learning with numbers, alphabet and history (Eritrea and north Ethiopia (Tigray-Province)).
 Ferrovia Eritrea Eritrean Railway 
 Atlas of Eritrea
 About Eritrea 
 Key Development Forecasts for Eritrea from International Futures.

Magazines
 Special section about Eritrea from Espresso online magazine 
 History of Eritrea: First recordings – Munzinger – exploitation by colonialism and fight against colonialism (Italy, England, Ethiopia, Soviet Union, USA, Israel) – independence 

Southern Region (Eritrea)
Populated places in Eritrea